Acetolactone or α-acetolactone is an organic compound with formula C2H2O2. It is the smallest member of the lactone family but can also be described as the epoxide of ethenone. The compound was described in 1997 as a transient species in mass spectrometry experiments.

Although acetolactone itself has not been isolated in bulk, the related species bis(trifluoromethyl)acetolactone ((CF3)2C2O2), which enjoys a degree of electronic stabilisation from its two trifluoromethyl groups, is known and has a half-life of 8 h at 25 °C. This compound is prepared by photolysis of bis(trifluoromethyl)malonyl peroxide.

See also
α-Propiolactone
Oxalic anhydride

References

Lactones
Epoxides
Substances discovered in the 1990s